This is a list of programs previously broadcast by TV5. For the currently aired shows of the network, please see the List of programs broadcast by TV5 (Philippine TV network).

Original/station-produced defunct programs

News5

Newscast

Philippine election series
Aplikante sa Senado (2019)
Balwarte (2013, 2019)
Pagbabago 2010: The TV5 and PPCRV Presidential Debate (2010)
Panahon Na! (2004)
Puso sa Puso: Evangelical Presidential Forum (2010)

Public affairs programs
Ako Mismo (2010–2011)
Ali! (2005–2007)
Anggulo (2011–2012)
Astig (2010–2011, 2013–2014)
The Big Story (1992–1995)
Bilang Pilipino (2016, ongoing)
Bigtime (2014)
Crime Klasik (2013)
The Chiefs (2019–2020, 2022, 2023)
Dayo (2013–2014)
Demolition Job (2013–2014)
Dokumentado (2010–2011, 2012–2013)
Dokyu (2005–2007)
Frontlines (2006–2007)
History with Lourd (2013–2016)
I Am Ninoy (2008–2009)
Idol In Action (2020–2021)
INQ TV (2004–2005)
Insider (2012)
Journo (2010–2012)
Kalikasan Kalusugan Kabuhayan (2013)
Kaya (2014–2016; 2017) 
Kontak 5 (1992–2000)
Lente (1993–1996)
Lupet (2010–2011)
Metro (2006–2007)
Mondo Manu (2011–2014)
News5 Imbestigasyon (2012–2013)
On Special Assignment (2001–2002)
Panahon Na (2004)
Panalo Ka 'Nay! (2018)
Presinto 5 (2012–2013)
The Probe Team Documentaries (2004–2005)
Public Forum (1992–1994)
Pulis! Pulis! (2008–2009)
Reaksyon: Aplikante (2013)
Real Stories kasama si Loren (2004–2007)
Reaksyon (2012–2017)
Rescue Mission (2008–2009)
Rescue5 (2013)
S.O.S.: Stories of Survival (2005–2008)
Take Out (2012–2014)
Tech Trip (2010)
That's My Job! (2008)
Timbangan (2010)
Tulong Ko, Pasa Mo (2017)
Totoo TV (ABC 5: 2005–2007; TV5: 2010–2011)
Tutok Tulfo (2010–2012)
Unang Tikim (2014–2015)
USI: Under Special Investigation (2010–2012)
Wanted (2011–2012)
Wasak (2013)
The Weekend News with Ramon Bautista (2008–2009)
Turning Point (2017–2018)
Versus (2017)
Word of the Lourd 
Yaman ng Bayan (2014)

Public service

Entertainment

Comedy

 BalitaOnenan! (2022)
 Happy Naman D'yan! (2020–2022)

Drama

Drama series

Fantasy and horror

Drama anthologies

Television films
Brillante Mendoza Presents (2017)
Tsinoy (February 4, 2017)
Everlasting (March 25, 2017)
Pagtatapos (April 22, 2017)
Panata (May 27, 2017)
Anak (June 25, 2017)
Kadaugan (July 30, 2017)
Entertainment Today Telesine Specials (1992–1999)
Studio 5 Original Movies (2014)
The Lady Next Door (February 4, 2014)
When I Fall In Love (February 11, 2014)
The Replacement Bride (February 18, 2014)
Bawat Sandali (February 25, 2014)
More Than Words (May 11, 2014)
Halik sa Dilim (October 30, 2014)

Kid-oriented shows

Informative

Lifestyle/magazine shows

Travelogue

Youth-oriented shows

Reality shows

Talent-based

Game shows

Talk shows

Variety and musical

Religious shows
A.S.T.I.G. (All Set To Imitate God) (produced by CBN Asia, Inc. 2005–2006)
The Chaplet of the Divine Mercy (1992–2008)
Community Mass on ABC (2004–2008)
Daily Mass at the Manila Cathedral (2020)
Family Land Children's Show (2006–2008)
Family Matters (2010–2016)
Family Rosary Crusade (1992–2008)
Guidelines With Dr. Harold J. Sala (2002–2005)
Inside The Fishbowl (produced by Shepherd's Voice Publications Inc., 2008–2010)
Kerygma TV (2007–2010)
Light Talk (2006–2008)
Misa Nazareno (2010–2020)
Mustard TV (produced by Shepherd's Voice Publications Inc., 2008–2010)
Power to Unite (2013–2021)
Signs & Wonders (2007–2008)
Simbang Gabi 2020 sa Quiapo Church (2020)
Sunday Mass at the Manila Cathedral (2020)
Sunday Mass on ABC (1992–2004)
This New Life At Alabang New Life (2009–2010)
Three Minutes a Day with Fr. James Reuter, S.J. (produced by Family Rosary Crusade, 2002–2008)
The Word Exposed with Bishop Luis Antonio Tagle, D.D. (produced by Jesuit Communications Foundation, 2008–2010)
The 700 Club Asia (produced by CBN Asia, Inc., 2002–2003)
Word Made Flesh (2004–2008)

Film movie blocks and specials
5 Max Movies (2008–2010)
ABC Onstage
ABC Theater
ABCinema (1992–1998, 2004–2008)
Action Packed Sabado (2010)
Action Spectacular (2020–2021)
Action Theater (1993–1996, 2001)
The Big Night (1992–2004)
Cine Cinco Hollywood Edition (2022)
Cinemalaya
Entertainment Today (1992–1999)
Friday Box Office (1996–2004)
Friday Fan Faves (2020–2021)
Friday Night Action (2013)
Golden Classics
Good Vibes Wednesday (2014)
Hollywood Movie (2021)
Monday Night Blockbusters (2013–2014)
More Action Theater
Movie Max 5 (2014–2018)
One Screen Presents (2020)
Onstage (produced by Viva Television, 2020–2021)
Primetime Mega-Hits (2019–2020)
Primetime Sine Festival (2021)
Primetime Super Sine (2011)
Sabado Blockbuster (2012–2013)
Sabado Sineplex (2011–2013)
Sabado Sinerama (2013–2014)
Sari-Sari Presents (2021-2022)
Saturday Night Blockbusters (1996–1998, 2006–2008)
Saturday Night Movies (2000–2001)
Saturday Night Specials (1998–1999, 2001-2003)
Shorts
Sine Asya (2020–2021)
Sine Klasiks (1992–2002)
Sine Ko Singko (2013)
Sine Ko 5ingko Indie 'To (2013)
Sine Ko 5ingko Premiere (2013)
Sine Spectacular (2019–2020)
Sine Squad (2016–2019)
Sine Squad Prime (2018)
Sine Squad Saturday (2019)
Sine Squad Sunday (2019)
Sinetanghali (2011–2013)
Sine Todo (2021-2022)
Sunday Night Movies (2001)
Sunday Night Specials (1996-2001)
Sunday Blockbuster (2012–2013)
Sunday Sineplex (2011–2013, 2014–2015)
Super Sine 5 (2011–2013)
Super Sine Prime (2012–2013)
Takilya Busters
Tuesday Christmas Countdown (2013)
Tuesday Happy Hour (2014)
Tuesday Night Blockbusters
Tuesday Nine-Thirty
TV5 Kids Movie Special (2013–2014)
TV5 Kids Presents Disney Movie (2011)
TV5 Kids Presents Marvel Animated Movies (2013)
TVflix (2020–2021)
Viva Blockbusters (1998–2000)
Viva Box Office (2003–2006)
Viva Cine Idols (2004–2005)
Wednesday Night Thriller (2013)
The Wonderful World of Disney (2015–2016)

Movie trailer shows
Movies to Watch (1993–1999)

Sports-oriented programs
ABAP: Go For Gold
Astig PBA (2007–2008)
Bakbakan Na (2017–2020)
The Basketball Show (2004–2005)
Basketball Science (2018–2019)
Blow by Blow (2015–2016)
Buhay PBA (2007–2008)
The Chasedown (2018–2019)
Hard Hat with Rannie Raymundo (1994–1999)
House of Hoops (2007–2008)
IPBA (2006–2007)
Kwentong Gilas (2014–2019)
The Road to Spain (2014)
My MVP (2008)
NCAA Games (2013–2015)
PBA Classics (2006–2008)
Pool Showdown (2007–2008)
Ringside (2004–2008)
Salpukan 360 (2018)
San Lazaro Hippodrome Horse Racing (1964–1967)
Speed by MP Turbo (2003–2004)
Sports 360 (2015–2016)
SportsCenter Philippines (2017–2020)
Sportspage (2020)
Stoplight TV (2009–2010)
Thunderbird Sabong Nation (2019–2020)
Time Out (2019)
Tukaan (2017–2020)
Ultimate Boxing Series (2019)
URCC TV (2009–2010)
Viva Main Event (produced by Viva Sports, 1998–2000)
World Class Boxing (in cooperation with Golden Boy Promotions, 2007–2008)
YHTube with the Younghusband Brothers (2015)

Others

Specials

Acquired and foreign programs

ABS-CBN blocktime programs

Anime series
2 Years Vacation with Dinosaurs (2001–2004)
Astro Boy (2006–2008)
Azumanga Daioh (2008–2009, 2009–2010)
Attack on Titan: Junior High (2017)
Battle Spirits (2010)
Black Blood Brothers (2008, 2009)
Casshern Sins (2010)
Clannad (2010)
Code Geass (2008–2010)
Cowboy Bebop (2008–2009)
Coyote Ragtime Show (2008–2009, 2009–2010)
Cyborg Kuro-chan (2004)
D.Gray-man (2010)
Destiny Warriors (Jyūshin Embu – Hero Tales)
DN Angel (2008)
Dragon League
Duel Masters (2008, 2009–2010)
F (2001–2004)
Fancy Lala (2001–2004)
Fullmetal Alchemist: Brotherhood (2009–2010)
Fushigi Yuugi (2009, 2015)
Golgo 13 (2010 – incomplete episodes)
Gundam 00 (2010 – incomplete episodes; 2013 – complete run)
Hamtaro (2010)
Hutch the Honeybee (1994, 2002–2003)
Is It Wrong to Try to Pick Up Girls in a Dungeon? (2017)
Kantai Collection (2017)
Kenichi: The Mightiest Disciple (2015)
Kimba the White Lion (1993)
Knights of Sidonia (2017)
Katri, Girl of the Meadows (2015)
Legendz (2009)
Lovely Detective Labyrinth (2009)
Lucky Star (2010)
Magical DoReMi (2015)
Starzan S (2009)
Maha Go! Go! Go! (Speed Racer X) (2001–2002)
Mai HiME (2008–2009)
Makibaoh (2009)
The Melancholy of Haruhi Suzumiya (2009 – incomplete episodes)
Mobile Suit Gundam 00 (2010, 2015)
Mon Colle Knights (2003)
My Hero Academia (seasons 1 and 2) (2021)
Myriad Colors Phantom World (2017)
The Mythical Detective Loki Ragnarok (2009)
Neon Genesis Evangelion (1996–1998)
Ninja Boy Rantaro (2004–2006)
Noein (2008, 2009)
Norn9 (2017)
Pollyanna (1994, 2015)
Prince Mackaroo (2010)
Pygmalio (1999, 2002–2003)
Ranma ½ (2009) 
Sailor Moon (1995–2004)
Shakugan no Shana and Shakugan no Shana Second (2008–2009)
Shurato
Special A (2009, 2010)
Slam Dunk (1995–1997)
Street Fighter II V (2010)
Sword Art Online (2015)
Time Quest (1994, 2001–2003)
Tokyo Majin (2008)
Toradora! (2009–2010)
Transformers: Animated (2015)
Transformers: Armada (2008)
Witchblade (2009)
Yaiba (1995–1996)
Yamato Nadeshiko Shichi Henge (2008–2010)
Yatterman (2010)

Cartoons and children's shows

Asian animation

Independent

Nick on ABC/TV5
The Adventures of Jimmy Neutron (2008–2010)
All Grown Up! (2007–2008)
Avatar: The Legend of Aang (2007–2010)
Blue's Clues (2006–2010)
CatDog (2006–2010)
Catscratch (2008–2010)
ChalkZone (2006–2010)
Danny Phantom (2006–2010)
Dora the Explorer (2006–2010)
Drake & Josh (2008)
El Tigre: The Adventures of Manny Rivera (2010)
Global Guts (2006–2007)
Go, Diego, Go! (2008–2010)
Hey Arnold! (2006–2007)
Legends of the Hidden Temple (2008–2010)
Oh Yeah! Cartoons (2007–2008)
Rocko's Modern Life (2008–2010)
SpongeBob SquarePants (2006–2010)
The Wild Thornberrys (2006–2007)
Wonder Pets! (2008–2010)

TV5 Kids Presents Cartoon Network
Adventure Time (2012–2014; 2021–2022)
The Amazing World of Gumball (2013–2014)
Batman: The Brave and the Bold (2010–2011)
Ben 10 (2010–2012; 2013–2015)
Ben 10: Alien Force (2012–2013)
Ben 10: Omniverse (2014–2015)
Ben 10: Ultimate Alien (2013–2015)
Chowder (2010–2011)
Codename: Kids Next Door (2012–2013, 2020–2021)
Courage the Cowardly Dog (2020–2021)
Dexter's Laboratory (2010–2015, 2020–2022)
Ed, Edd n Eddy (2010–2011, 2020-2022)
Generator Rex (2011–2014)
The Grim Adventures of Billy & Mandy (2010)
League of Super Evil (2010–2011)
The Misadventures of Flapjack (2013–2014)
My Gym Partner's a Monkey (2010–2011)
The Powerpuff Girls (2010–2014)
The Powerpuff Girls (2016–2017)
Powerpuff Girls Z (2011–2013)
Regular Show (2013–2014)
Samurai Jack (2022)
Sym-Bionic Titan (2013–2014)
Teen Titans (2011–2013)
The Secret Saturdays  (2012–2014)
We Bare Bears (2016–2017)

TV5 Kids Presents Disney Club

Telenovelas
Betty sa NY (2020–2021)
Doble Cara (2006)
Letty La Mas Fea (2006)
La Reina del Sur (2016–2017)
La Suerte de Loli (2022)
La Viuda de Blanco (1999)
María Bonita (1998)
Maria Mercedes (2021)
Maria la del Barrio (2021–2022)
Morena Clara (1996)
Rebelde (2008–2009)
Reina de Corazones (2021–2022)
Tierra de Reyes (2020–2021)
Untamed Beauties (2008–2009)

Tokusatsu/Super Sentai
Fiveman (1999–2000)
Guyferd (1999–2004, 2010–2011)
Janperson (1998–2000)
Jetman (1998–1999)
Masked Rider Blade (2008–2009)
Masked Rider Hibiki (2009)
Sky Ranger Gavan (1994–1996, 1999–2000)

Variety and musical

Game/reality/talent shows
American Idol (2004–2007)
The Apprentice with Donald Trump (seasons 1 to 5) (2004–2005)
The Apprentice with Martha Stewart (2005–2006)
Asia's Next Top Model (2014, 2016–2017)
Asia's Next Top Model (cycle 2)1 (2014)
Asia's Next Top Model (cycle 4)1 (2016)
Asia's Next Top Model (cycle 5)1 (2017)
Asian Idol (2007–2008)
Breaking the Magician's Code (2020-2021)
Catfish (2016–2017)
Dance Moms  (2020)
Disaster Date (2017)
Ex on the Beach (2016–2017)
Fear Factor (2004–2006)
Friendzone (2016)
Guinness World Records (2000–2007)
Killer Karaoke1 (2013)
MasterChef Asia1 (2015–2016)
Maximum Exposure (2006–2008)
Record Breakers (2008)
Rock Star: INXS (2005)
So You Think You Can Dance? (2005)
Temptation Island
There's Something About Miriam
Video Zonkers
Worst-Case Scenarios (2006–2007)

American/Canadian series
ALF (1999–2002)
Alfred Hitchcock Presents (1992)
America's Funniest Home Videos (2016–2017)
Arrow (2016–2018)
Batman (1992–1993)
Beach Patrol (2000–2001)
Big Bad Beetleborgs (2000–2002)
Blindspot (2017–2018)
Boiling Points (2017)
Bugging Out (2016–2017)
Bugs (2002–2004)
The Burning Zone (2000–2001)
The Cape (1998–2000)
Cashmere Mafia (2008)
Chicago Sons (1997–2001)
Clueless (1997–1999)
Cobra (1994)
The Cosby Show (1997–2001)
Diagnosis: Murder (2000–2001)
Eerie, Indiana
ER (1996–2004)
Family Ties  (1998–2000, 2001–2006)
FBI: The Untold Stories
Frasier (1994–1996)
Friends (1995–2006)
F/X: The Series (2000–2002)
Gagsters (2004)
Gotham (2020–2021)
Growing Pains (1993–2000)
The Hat Squad (1993–1994)
Hearts Are Wild
Hercules: The Legendary Journeys (2000–2001)
High Tide (2000–2002)
Highlander: The Series
The Hitchhiker
How Clean Is Your House? (2006)
Hunter
Krypton (2022)
The Last Frontier (1992–1995)
Law & Order: Trial by Jury (2005–2006)
Legends of Tomorrow (2020)
Life Goes On (1993–1997)
Life with Roger (2001–2003)
Lois & Clark: The New Adventures of Superman (1993–1998)
Love Monkey (2008)
MADtv (2001–2004)
Marvel's Agents of S.H.I.E.L.D. (2015–2017)
Masked Rider
Midnight Caller
Muppets Tonight (1998–2000)
Murphy Brown (1994–1997)
New York Undercover (2000–2001)
Nikita (2016–2017)
Normal, Ohio (2001–2004)
Once Upon a Time (2016)
Outcast (2016)
Peaceable Kingdom (1992)
Police Academy: The Series (2000–2002)
Poltergeist: The Legacy (2002–2003)
The Powers of Matthew Star (2000–2001)
Prison Break (2017)
Quantico (2017)
Quantum Leap (1992–1993)
Rachel Gunn, R.N. (1992)
Raven
Sabrina, the Teenage Witch (1998–2001)
Scandal (2016–2017)
Scorpion (2017–2019)
Seinfeld (2001–2002)
Sentinel (1998–2002)
Sightings
Sliders (2000–2001)
Small Wonder (1992–1996)
Smallville (2016–2017)
Snow Buddies
Soldier Of Fortune (2000–2001)
Spy Game
Star Trek: Deep Space Nine (1997–1999)
Star Trek: The Next Generation (1999–2001)
Star Trek: The Original Series (1994–1997)
Star Trek: Voyager (2001–2003)
Strangers (2000–2001)
Suddenly Susan (1998–2001)
Supergirl (2017–2018)
Supernatural (2014–2018)
Super Bloopers & Practical Jokes
Sweet Valley High
Tattooed Teenage Alien Fighters from Beverly Hills (1995–1996, 2002–2003)
Tarzan (2000–2001)
Team Knight Rider (2000–2001)
Teen Wolf (2015–2017)
That '70s Show (2001–2004)
That's Incredible! (1999–2001)
The New Adventures of Robin Hood (2003–2004)
Touched by an Angel (1996–2002)
Two (2002–2003)
Under Suspicion
The Vampire Diaries (2015–2017)
Viper
VR Troopers (1998–2000, 2002–2003; 2006)
The Walking Dead (2016–2018)
Working (2001–2004)
Xena: Warrior Princess

Australian TV shows
Ancient X-Files (2016)

British TV shows
Hacking the System (2016)
Mr. Bean (1998–2000)

Documentary
Ancient Aliens (2020–2021)

Asianovelas
8 Kingdom (2011)
Amachan (2015–2016)
Amazing Twins (2004)
Angel Heart (2020–2021)
Black and White (2010)
Bride of the Century (2014)
Cool Guys, Hot Ramen (2014)
Count Your Lucky Stars (2021)
Cheer up on Love (2011)
Crouching Tiger (2004)
Don't Cry, My Love (2010–2011)
Don't Worry Be Happy (2009–2010)
Easy Fortune Happy Life (2010)
Fireworks (2004)
First Wives' Club (2010–2011)
Flames of Desire (2011)
Furious Fire (2020)
Gangster Love: Metamorphosis (2010)
Giant (2012–2013)
Glass Castle (2010–2011)
Golden Bride (2008–2009)
Good Wife, Bad Wife (2011)
Hero (2010)
High Kick! (2010)
Judge Bao (2007–2008)
Likeable or Not  (2013–2014)
The Little Ngongya (2009–2010)
Love You a Thousand Times (2012)
Mr. Fighting Fight for Love (2005)
My Wife is a Superwoman (2010)
Oh Su Jung vs. Karl (2008)
Pink Lipstick (2012–2013)
Remember: War of the Son (2022)
Reply 1988 (2020–2021)
Runaway (2012)
The Secret Life of My Secretary (2021)
Scent of Love (2004)
Smile Honey (2010)
Split (2010)
The Accidental Couple (2016)
The Beauty Inside (2021)
The Loyal Wife (2021)
The Outsiders (2004)
Time Between Dog and Wolf (2010)
True Beauty (2021–2022)
Under One Roof (2009–2010)
Water Boys (2008–2009)
Welcome to Waikiki (2021)
What's For Dinner? (2011)
White Lies (2012–2013)
Wok of Love (2020)
Women of Times (2009–2010)
You Are My Destiny (2013–2014)

Indian dramas
Mumbai Thrillers (2005)

Sports-oriented programs
Around the Horn (2018–2019)
All Star Professional Wrestling (1993–1997)
30 for 30 (2018–2019)
Boxing's Greatest Fights (2018–2019)
 Draft Academy (2018)
Pardon the Interruption (2018–2019)
High Noon (2018–2019)
IndyCar Series (2018)
TNA Impact (2004–2006)
NFL on TV5 (2017–2019)
ONE Championship 
WWE Raw (ABC 5: 1994–2001, 2007–2008, TV5: 2009–2010, 2018–2019)
WWE SmackDown** (ABC 5: 2007–2008, TV5: 2009–2010, 2017–2019)
Top Rank Boxing (2018–2019)
UFC Fight Night (2015–2020)
The World of X Games (2017–2019)

See also
 TV5 (Philippine TV network)
 List of programs broadcast by TV5 (Philippine TV network)

Notes

External links
 Official website of TV5

References

 
TV5
TV5